World Leaders, also known as Chiefs of State and Cabinet Members of Foreign Governments, is a public domain directory published weekly by the United States Central Intelligence Agency. It lists different state officials for each country of the world: the head of state and/or head of government and other cabinet ministers, the chief of the central bank, and the ambassadors to the United Nations and the United States.

See also
The International Who's Who
List of current heads of state and government
National Security Agency academic publications
World-Check

References

External links
World Leaders
World Leaders Autograph Society, the international community of collectors who collect autographs of world leaders

Central Intelligence Agency publications
Directories
Heads of government
Heads of state
Public domain databases